The Fabulous Country Music Sound of Buck Owens is an album by American country artist Buck Owens, released in 1962. It is not completely a Buck Owens album and includes tracks by Dottie West, Cowboy Copas, Eddie Wilson and Tommy Hill.

Track listing
 "Down on the Corner of Love" (Buck Owens), performed by Buck Owens
 "There Goes My Love" (Owens), performed by Buck Owens
 "Above and Beyond (The Call of Love)" (Harlan Howard), performed by Tommy Hill
 "House Down the Block" (Owens), performed by Buck Owens
 "Under the Influence of Love" (Howard, Owens), performed by Cowboy Copas
 "Mental Cruelty" (Larry Davis, Dixie Davis, Owens), performed by Cowboy Copas & Dottie West
 "Sweethearts in Heaven" (Owens), performed by Buck Owens
 "It Don't Show on Me" (Owens), performed by Buck Owens
 "Foolin' Around" (Howard, Owens), performed by Eddie Wilson
 "Right After the Dance" (Owens), performed by Buck Owens
 "Excuse Me (I Think I've Got a Heartache)" (Howard, Owens), performed by Darrell McCall
 "Loose Talk" (Freddie Hart, Ann Lucas), performed by Cowboy Copas & Dottie West

Buck Owens albums
1962 compilation albums